For sarcode in:
 Microbiology, see Amoeba#Amoebae as organisms
 Homeopathy, see Homeopathy#Preparations and treatment